Peak Season is an MTV Canada reality TV show set in Whistler, British Columbia.  The premier was on October 19, 2009, and delivered the highest ratings for a series on MTV Canada.  The show follows the lives of several young adult characters in the reality television style.  The show concluded its first season December 14, 2009, aired on MTV Canada on Monday nights at 10 p.m. EST, and was followed by The After Show.

Starring
The Reality TV show follows the lives of young adults living in the Canadian ski resort of Whistler.

References

External links
Official Page on mtv.ca
‘Peak Season’ Emerges On MTV
'Peak Season' To Look at the Sexy Side of the Whistler Slopes

CBC Television original programming
2009 Canadian television series debuts
2009 Canadian television series endings
2000s Canadian reality television series